Kubota Station (久保田駅) is the name of two train stations in Japan:

 Kubota Station (Akita)
 Kubota Station (Saga)